Creston is a town in the Kootenay region of southeastern British Columbia, Canada. By road, Creston is roughly equidistant between Cranbrook ( to the east) and Castlegar ( to the west) along the Crowsnest Highway.

Time zone and Kootenay descriptive
Settlements on the east shore of Kootenay Lake and along BC Highway 3 from Creston to Yahk are among the few areas of Canada that do not observe daylight saving time, remaining on Mountain Standard Time year-round. Forming a natural boundary, the lake and the Kootenay Pass on the Salmo–Creston highway divide the Pacific Time Zone from the mountain one. When daylight saving ends, the time change migrates from Yahk to the Kootenay Bay ferry landing. Consequently, Creston in the warmer months is on Castlegar time and in the colder months on Cranbrook time.

East Kootenay 
The 1860 survey defined the Purcell Mountains as the east–west divide, which geographically places Creston in East Kootenay, but Crawford Bay in West Kootenay. Since the highway to Salmo did not open until 1963, Creston developed cultural links eastward. Minor sports, both hockey and baseball, belonged to East Kootenay leagues.

West Kootenay 
An 1899 advertisement described the Creston Townsite Co. as West Kootenay Valley. Since the highest passes of the Purcells are north-northeast, Creston might be considered in the west. Regional politics are centred at Nelson, which is in West Kootenay.

Central Kootenay 
The Creston Review, first published in 1908, took a neutral stance. However, for several years, a front-page banner stated: "All roads in East Kootenay and West Kootenay lead to Creston." Prior to the creation of the Regional District of Central Kootenay in 1965, Central Kootenay did not exist as a geographic concept. Most locals still do not accept the idea. Those on the fence regard Creston as a sort of transition between east and west, or from a time zone perspective, as being west in summer and east in winter.

First Nations and European early visitors
The Lower Kootenay Band of the Ktunaxa Nation has occupied the region from time immemorial. Tribal members would paddle their canoes across the flooded flats, harvesting wild rice, one of the staples of their diet. The people called the Creston area Yaqan Nukiy, meaning "where the rock stands." Europeans referred to this area as the Goat River district. Established in 1865, this section of the Dewdney Trail travelled southeast via present day Wynndel and Creston, before following the Goat River valley northeastward. On an 1882 hunting trip, William A. Baillie-Grohman and Teddy Roosevelt camped in the vicinity of today's Creston. Baillie-Grohman noted the agricultural potential of the flats if protected from flooding. The Kutenai language is noted for its uniqueness, as were the tribe's distinctive sturgeon-nosed canoes. Members reside in several local reserves. As of 2020, the Lower Kootenay Band is in Stage 4 of the British Columbia Treaty Process.

Name origin
In 1891, three settlers obtained  lots. Of today's town, John Wilson Dow owned the northern portion, Fred. G. Little, the centre, and John Arrowsmith, the southwestern corner. The Columbia and Kootenay Steam Navigation Company twice weekly run between Nelson and Bonners Ferry served the growing community on the edge of the flats.

The place was formerly known as Fred Little's ranch and then as the eighth siding during the Canadian Pacific Railway (CP) construction. The name of Fisher was chosen for the initial timetable published in August 1898, assumedly after Sydney Arthur Fisher, a politician friendly to the railway. Some confusion existed as to whether a rename to Sirdar would be adopted. Sirdar was the title assigned to the commander-in-chief of the British-controlled Egyptian Army in the late 19th and early 20th centuries.

Residents preferred the name Creston, which appears to have been in popular use. Fred Little selected the name after Creston, Iowa, where he had worked for the Chicago, Burlington and Quincy Railroad, which also stood at the outlet of a major water body. The residents petitioned CP to change the name from Fisher to Creston, a request CP granted before late 1899.

Railways
CP accepted offers from Little and Dow for a half-interest in their properties. During construction, the CP rail head passed northwestward toward Kuskonook in September 1898. Although construction trains offered passenger service until mid-October, the line was not handed over to CP until mid-November, but services on the western section did not resume until mid-December. The two-storey station was erected that year.

In December 1899, the Bedlington & Nelson Railway (B&N), a Great Northern Railway subsidiary, assumed possession of the completed line from the main contractor. The route followed today's Lower Wynndel Rd (low road). In July 1900, the B&N began limited services and that November, a daily service to Kuskonook. That August, B&N's operations north of the junction (Wynndel) were suspended. Soon, there was little activity north of Creston.
Certainly by February 1904, the three times weekly mixed train ran no farther north than Creston. In December 1914, the final twice weekly mixed train ran north to Creston, and the Wynndel–Porthill track was lifted in 1916.

In 1949, CP replaced the former station with a single level flat-roofed one.
Passenger service on the route ended in 1964.
In 1982, the station closed. In 1990, track removal left only one siding, and the brewery spur.

Early community
Little and the CP created separate subdivisions, which sold quickly. In late 1898, Robt. J. Long built the first hotel. By 1900, a settlement was growing around Long's Creston and John Munroe's Queen's hotels on the portion of Little's subdivision below the tracks. To meet demand, Little further subdivided above the tracks, to where William Crawford and Charles Faas moved their general stores, now the downtown. In 1907, a Canadian Bank of Commerce branch opened. The next year, The Creston Review began publication. Creston was incorporated as a village in 1924. The next year, exchanges of gunfire occurred during a bank robbery. One outlaw was captured the following afternoon. His unidentified partner disappeared with $4,000. In 1930, Dr. Olivier opened an eleven-bed hospital, and the Creston Hotel (1898) burned to the ground. In 1949, the Kootenay Hotel opened. In 1960, Interior Breweries began production at a new brewery. Creston was incorporated as a town in 1966. In 1974, the Labatt Brewing Company acquired 84 per cent of Columbia Brewing Company (the 1972 rename of Interior Breweries).

Agriculture

About 1884, likely associated with the Baillie-Grohman reclamation plan, the first settlers arrived, cleared the slopes around today's Creston, and planted orchards, but obtained no preemptions. In the early 1890s, William Rodger and Jane Huscroft, with their large family and cattle, squatted on the flats. During 1893, crews dyked the river, but the exceptional flooding during the following spring destroyed much of the work. In partnership with the Kootenay Valley Power and Development Co., settlers completed reconstruction that year, reclaiming . Later deterioration of the dykes resumed annual flooding, leaving the land suitable only for hay harvests.

Apple and cherry orchards were well established by 1920s. As returning World War I veterans developed farms on the flat lands to the south, grain harvests increased. Grain elevators were built in Creston by the Midland Pacific Grain Corporation in 1935 and the Alberta Wheat Pool in 1936 and 1949. Rebuilt dyking of a few years earlier succumbed to floods in 1938 and 1948. The first annual Blossom Festival was held in 1942. In 2018, the Columbia Basin Trust acquired the two remaining abandoned elevators (1935 and 1936) with a view to restoration.

Lumber
Small sawmills were established in 1898 and around 1903. In 1907, C.O. Rodgers erected a mill at the mouth of the Goat River gorge. In partnership with D.W. Briggs, he reorganized as the Canyon City Lumber Co. in 1911. After a 1923 fire destroyed the mill, the rebuild, known as Creston Sawmills, opened in 1924. The specialized Rodgers Box Factory catered to the fruit and berry trade. The sawmill closed in 1981 and the buildings torn down. The veneer and planer mills, which closed a decade later, were also demolished.

Road/air transportation
By 1909, the highway to Cranbrook was rated as good. By 1910, a passable trail existed east to Lethbridge, which by 1912 was a main road. After realignments, a proper gravel highway opened in 1920. In 1932, the route became the No. 3, Interprovincial Highway, remaining for years the main road connection between the two western provinces.

Southward, a wagon road existed by the 1890s, which was periodically upgraded over the following decades. 

In 1931, the ferry/highway auto route north to Nelson was inaugurated. 

When Canyon St. was widened in 1947 for the new Crowsnest Highway, the frontage buildings moved  back.

The October 1963 opening of the Salmo–Creston highway rerouted most traffic from the ferry route.

Creston is served by the Creston Valley Airport formerly known as the Art Sutcliffe Field. In 2017, the pilot of a small plane safely made an emergency landing on Highway 3 west of Creston.

Prior to Greyhound Canada ceasing all intraprovincial services in 2018, an application the prior year included a service reduction via Creston. The summer bus service between Kaslo and Calgary, instituted by a regional operator in 2019, included a Creston stop.

In 2021, the Creston Valley Transit System replaced its fleet of diesel-powered buses with four light-duty, gasoline-driven buses.

Communications and utilities
In 1907, the Creston Power Light & Telephone Co (CPL&T) installed phone wires northwest to Duck Creek, east to Erickson, and south to Porthill, Idaho. The next year, the Goat Mountain Waterworks replaced transporting water by wagon from Wynndel.

The excess from electricity generation by the sawmill was sold to the Creston Power, Light and Telephone Company. In 1934, West Kootenay Power & Light (WKP&L) replaced the mill supply, using transmission lines from the Goat River Dam.

In 2015, Telus completed a project to string fibre optic cables for residential and business use.

A $1.1M upgrade in 2017 to the undersized Schikurski Pump Station secured the town water supply.

Later community
Creston offers an infrastructure typical of a town of this size, including brewery tours, a shopping mall, golf course and a large selection of motels, hotels, and three campsites. The Ramada hotel (2012) was the first new hotel in Creston in decades. In 2011, the Creston & District Community Complex (1971) received new flooring and upgraded amenities.

The Creston-based Kokanee Beer movie entry won a Gold Lion at the 2013 Cannes Lions International Festival of Creativity. That year, Budweiser production began at the Columbia Brewery.

The Art Deco style Tivoli Theatre (1938) and many of these 1930-ish wood-framed structures in the downtown area seek to mimic this architectural style. The long-vacant Kootenay Hotel has been transformed into a wine bar, taphouse and restaurant. The Creston Hotel has also been extensively modernized.

After a 2015 fire extensively damaged Trinity United Church, reconstruction work did not start until two years later.

Media
The Creston Valley is served by AM radio station CFKC-AM at 1340 kHz (rebroadcasting CJAT-FM Trail, BC), and by FM radio stations CKCV-FM at 94.1 MHz, CIDO-FM at 97.7 MHz (dormant as of 2021), and CBTS-FM at 100.3 MHz (rebroadcasting CBTK-FM Kelowna, BC as part of the CBC Radio One network). The local newspaper is the Creston Valley Advance.

Demographics

Ethnicity

Religion 
According to the 2021 census, religious groups in Creston included:
Irreligion (2,675 persons or 49.8%)
Christianity (2,525 persons or 47.0%)
Hinduism (35 persons or 0.7%)
Buddhism (25 persons or 0.5%)
Judaism (15 persons or 0.3%)
Sikhism (10 persons or 0.2%)
Other (75 persons or 1.4%)

Climate
Creston has either an inland oceanic climate or a humid continental climate, depending on the isotherm used. Creston's climate is often modified by air masses of the Pacific Ocean origin, especially in winter. Daily maximum temperatures are usually above freezing even in January except when air masses of Arctic origin move over the area. The worst cold outbreaks may send temperatures below  on rare occasions. Spring comes early by Canadian standards; trees usually start to leaf out before the end of April. The first fall frost usually holds off until October where air drainage is good.

Flora and fauna

The moisture-loving western hemlock grows near the town's northern boundary; another wet-belt indicator, the western red cedar, is common in the area. The sun-loving ponderosa pine forms a larger proportion of the vegetation near Creston's southern boundary. Douglas fir is the most common native tree throughout; other large conifers include grand fir, western larch, western white pine and lodgepole pine. Large pines other than the ponderosa are seldom seen in town, but are common in some of the woods nearby. The only native deciduous tree which matches the conifers in size is the black cottonwood. White birch and trembling aspen grow to medium size; smaller trees include the Rocky Mountain maple and bitter cherry. Prominent among the non-native trees are blue spruce, horsechestnut, Norway maple, silver maple, and several species of walnut, including the butternut. There also are occasional examples of catalpa, chestnut, London plane, and tulip tree.

Large mammals at Creston include cougar, bear, beaver, coyote, deer, elk, moose, muskrat and river otter. More than 265 bird species occur in the Creston Valley, which is in a migration corridor for waterfowl such as goose and swan; the valley is also a wintering area for birds of prey. The Creston area hosts British Columbia's only remaining population of northern leopard frog.

Physiography and soils

Creston is built on rolling bench-land immediately to the east of the Kootenay River floodplain. Beyond the bench-land to the east are the Purcell Mountains; their steep west-facing scarps are mistakenly called the Skimmerhorns, while the Selkirk Mountains rise west of the floodplain.

Silt loam is the most common soil texture at Creston. The floodplain soils are dark and poorly drained for the most part; they are excellent for pasture and grains where drainage is improved. Some of the bench-land soils are brown and of good tilth; others are gray, deficient in organic matter, and have rather heavy calcareous subsoils.

Notable current and former residents 
William Munroe Archibald, aviator
Johnny Bucyk, former NHL hockey player (Boston Bruins and New York Islanders)
Irwin Crosthwait, painter
Aaron Douglas, actor
Edward Joseph Garland, politician and diplomat
Jamie Huscroft, former NHL hockey player
Pascale Hutton, actress
Darren Jensen, former NHL goalie (Philadelphia Flyers)
Squadron Leader Clarence "C.B." Lang, Team Leader, RCAF Golden Centennaires, 1960s
Dmytro Lazorko, politician
Rob Morrison, politician
John Gordon Perrin, volleyball player
Duncan Regehr, actor
Randy Rota, former NHL hockey player
Francis Henry Shepherd, politician and engineer
Jayli Wolf, musician and actress

Youth Programs
Royal Canadian Army Cadets
Royal Canadian Air Cadets

Sports
Creston Combat Fitness
Creston Judo Club
Creston Curling Club
Creston Ospreys Rowing Club
Creston Valley Thundercats junior 'B' hockey team
Creston Waves Swim club
Creston Valley Skating Club

See also
Creston Valley Wildlife Management Area

Notes

References

External links

 Official Town of Creston Website

Towns in British Columbia
Populated places in the Regional District of Central Kootenay